Harry W. K. Tom is a physicist and professor at the University of California, Riverside. He was elected a fellow of the American Physical Society in 2000, "[f]or pioneering contributions to our understanding of the ultrafast dynamics of surface chemical and physical reactions, particularly femtosecond laser-induced nonequilibrium phase transitions and chemical reactions."

References

University of California, Riverside faculty
Fellows of the American Physical Society
20th-century physicists
21st-century physicists
Year of birth missing (living people)
Living people